Group A of the 2013 Fed Cup Asia/Oceania Zone Group II was one of two pools in the Asia/Oceania zone of the 2013 Fed Cup. Five teams competed in a round robin competition, with the teams proceeding to their respective sections of the play-offs: the top team played for advancement to the 2014 Group I.

Standings

Round robin

Hong Kong vs. Turkmenistan

Singapore vs. Vietnam

Hong Kong vs. Singapore

New Zealand vs. Vietnam

Hong Kong vs. New Zealand

Turkmenistan vs. Singapore

New Zealand vs. Turkmenistan

Hong Kong vs. Vietnam

New Zealand vs. Singapore

Turkmenistan vs. Vietnam

References

External links
 Fed Cup website

2013 Fed Cup Asia/Oceania Zone